Gisela Schlesinger Selden-Goth (6 June 1884 - 5 September 1975) was a Hungarian author, composer and musicologist who became an American citizen in 1939. She composed at least four string quartets and donated her large collection of original music manuscripts to the Library of Congress (see https://memory.loc.gov/diglib/ihas/loc.natlib.scdb.200033734/default.html).  Her writing and musical compositions were published under the name Gisela Selden-Goth.

Biography
Selden-Goth was born in Budapest to Michael and Rosalia Schlesinger. Her music teachers included Bela Bartok, Ferruccio Busoni, and Istvan Thoman. Her piano composition was one of 10 winners (out of 874 submissions) in the 1910 Signals for the Musical World competition in Germany. She married Ernst Goth and they had a daughter, Trudy Goth, who became a dancer and journalist.

Selden-Goth lived in Berlin and Florence, Italy, before emigrating to America in 1938. She returned to Florence in 1950 and remained there until her death in 1975. She served as a music critic for newspapers in Berlin, Prague, Switzerland, and Budapest, most notably for Prager Tagblatt, a German newspaper in Prague. She also wrote books about Busoni and Arturo Toscanini and edited a collection of Felix Mendelssohn’s letters. She maintained a lengthy correspondence with the Austrian writer Stefan Zweig, often discussing their mutual interest in collecting original music scores. After Zweig’s suicide, Selden-Goth commented that. . . “A chamber group in a house or the opportunity to hear a good orchestra might have relieved the tension of that mind tortured by personal forebodings and by the vision of mankind in agony.” She also corresponded with composer Ernest Bloch and musicologist Hans Moldenhauer.

Selden-Goth’s music is published today by Universal Edition. Her prose works and musical compositions include:

Selected literary publications

Articles 
“A New Collection of Music Manuscripts in the United States” (The Music Quarterly vol 26 no 2 Apr 1940) 
“Neue Wege der musikalischen Erziehung” (New Ways in Music Education) Die Musik vol 16 1924

Books 
Arturo Toscanini (edited by Selden-Goth)  
Felix Mendelssohn: Letters (edited by Selden-Goth) 
Ferruccio Busoni: Der Versuch Eines Porträts (Ferruccio Busoni: An Attempt at a Portrait)

Selected music works

Chamber music 

Quintet, opus 35 (for strings)
String Quartets No. 1, 2, 3, and 4
String Trio
Suite for Violin and Piano

Piano 

Prelude and Fugue for Two Pianos (1956)
Signals Competition Winner (1910)

Vocal music 

Book of Monastic Life, opus 44 (text from Book of Hours by Rainer Maria Rilke)
Cantata
Songs
The Pilgrim (baritone, mixed chorus and orchestra)

References

External links
Gisella Selden-Goth Collection at the Library of Congress

1884 births
1975 deaths
Hungarian composers
Women composers
String quartet composers
Hungarian musicologists
Hungarian women writers
People from Budapest
20th-century musicologists
Hungarian emigrants to the United States